Club Ciclista Juninense is an Argentine sports club based in Junín, Buenos Aires. It was founded as a cycling club, but basketball has become the main sport of the club. The squad plays in the La Liga Argentina de Básquet (formerly "Torneo Nacional de Ascenso", the second division of the Argentine league system. Club's home arena is the Raúl Chuni Merlo Stadium.

History
The club was founded on November 6, 1923, by a group of friends with the purpose of encouraging the practise of cycling in the city of Junín. Its first president was Salvador Campo, and the club rented a land to the charity Hospital of the city, to make a circuit there. Once the circuit was finished, the first racing was held on November 11, 1923.

In 1925 the colors green, red, and white were adopted as club's official colors, remaining to date. 

Basketball began to be practised at the club at the end of the 1920s. In 1929 Ciclista won its first title, defeating team "Los Indios" by 12-11. In 1931 Ciclista inaugurated its basketball arena, erected on Aristóbulo del Valle street. By those years the Municipality of Junín temporarily gave the club a land in order to build a new cycling circuit there, which was finished and opened on December 6, 1931. In 1942 Ciclista acquired the land where its basketball court had been built years before, which was considered a great achievement for the club and its members.

The basketball squad won two other titles, in 1952 and 1954, defeating San Martín and Los Indios respectively. One year later the club inaugurated a new basketball stadium.

Titles
Liga Juninense de Básquet (3): 1929, 1952, 1954

References

External links
 
 Ciclista Juninense at LNB

Basketball teams in Argentina
Basketball teams established in 1932